Trois versions de la vie (literally Three versions of life) is the fifth play by the French writer Yasmina Reza, written in 2000. It was produced at the Théâtre Antoine in Paris in 2001, in a production directed by Patrice Kerbrat and with a cast composed of Catherine Frot, Stéphane Freiss,  Richard Berry and the author herself.

Its English translation by Christopher Hampton, under the title Life x 3,  was premiered at the Lyttleton auditorium of the Royal National Theatre from 7 December 2000 to 16 January 2001, before transferring to the Old Vic from 12 February to 5 May 2001 with the entire original cast of Mark Rylance, Harriet Walter, Imelda Staunton and Oliver Cotton. It was then revived with a new cast at the Savoy Theatre in 2002. 26 September to.

A production was performed in Brighton during August 2013 by Pretty Villain Productions.

References

External links
http://www.londontheatre.co.uk/londontheatre/reviews/lifex300.htm
http://www.telegraph.co.uk/culture/3583667/An-evening-torn-apart-by-chaos.html
http://thelatest.co.uk/brighton/2013/08/20/yasmina-rezas-dark-comedy-life-x-3-at-wagner-hall/

French plays
2000 plays